Dan Schneider (born 1966) is an American actor and television producer.

Dan Schneider may also refer to:

 Dan Schneider (writer) (born 1965), American poet, writer, and film critic
 Dan Schneider (baseball) (born 1942), former American baseball player
 Dan Schneider (entrepreneur) (born 1981), American entrepreneur and CEO
 Daniel Schneider, a suspect in the 2007 bomb plot in Germany

See also
 Daniel Schnider (born 1973), Swiss cyclist
 Daniel Schnyder (born 1961), Swiss jazz reedist and composer
 Daniel Schneidermann (born 1958), French journalist
 Daniel Snyder (disambiguation)